Rokietnica  (Roketnytsia) is a village in Jarosław County, Subcarpathian Voivodeship, in south-eastern Poland. It is the seat of the gmina (administrative district) called Gmina Rokietnica.

The village has a population of 2,500.

References

Rokietnica